Adam Lopez Costa (born 26 August 1975) is an Australian pop musician, vocal coach, and session vocalist. He is noted for his ability to produce extremely high notes in his whistle register and for his extensive six-octave vocal range. From 2008 to 2018, he was a Guinness World Record holder for singing the highest note (by a male) and a half step below the E in the 8th octave (E8).  He currently heads the vocal faculty at Sheldon College's Australian School of the Arts.

Biography
Lopez was the second of three sons born to Spanish parents, Manuel Jesús López Pérez and María Del Rosario Costa Velasco. Both of his parents were musicians. Having started singing at the age of three, Lopez was a treble (boy soprano) by age ten. After finishing high school, Lopez studied voice at the Queensland Conservatorium of Music at Griffith University. He spent five years there studying opera, although he spent a total of ten years developing his distinctive vocal abilities.

In addition to solo work, Lopez has worked as a session vocalist, singing backing vocals for Mariah Carey, Debelah Morgan, Keith Urban, Vanessa Amorosi, and other Australian artists. He has also worked in television and radio.

His 2008 Latino album titled Till The End of Time features Australian jazz musician James Morrison on trumpet.

Previous World record
According to the Guinness Book of World Records, Lopez held the world record for highest vocal note produced by a male from 2008 to 2018. That pitch is designated D8 in note-octave notation; it is three semitones above the highest note on a standard grand piano or 4435 Hz. Before achieving this record, Lopez held the previous Guinness World Record for singing a C8 in 2005. On 20 January 2018, the record was surpassed by Xiao Lung Wang from China recognised by Guinness World Record for singing E8 or 5243 Hz.

Discography

Studio albums 
 2005: The Popera EP
 2006: Showstopper
 2008: Till the End of Time
 2014: Kaleidoscope
 2017: This Heart of Mine

Singles 
 2014: "When All Is Said And Done"
 2014: "Paper Boat"
 2015: "You / Holiday" – double single

References

External links

Australian people of Spanish descent
Living people
Place of birth missing (living people)
Musicians from Brisbane
Queensland Conservatorium Griffith University alumni
Singers with a six-octave or greater vocal range
1975 births
21st-century Australian male singers
Latin music musicians